Nizhneye Kaltyayevo (Tübänge Kältäy) is a rural locality (a village) in Kaltyayevsky Selsoviet, Tatyshlinsky District, Bashkortostan, Russia. The population was 41 as of 2010. There is 1 street.

Geography 
Nizhneye Kaltyayevo is located 11 km southeast of Verkhniye Tatyshly (the district's administrative centre) by road. Vyazovka is the nearest rural locality.

References 

Rural localities in Tatyshlinsky District